Calisto chrysaoros is a butterfly of the family Nymphalidae. It is endemic to Hispaniola, where it is found at high elevations on both southern and northern paleoislands in the refugias.

The larvae feed on Arthrostylidium species.

References

Butterflies described in 1935
Calisto (butterfly)